The 2020 Safari Rally (also known as the KCB Safari Rally Kenya 2020) was a motor racing event for rally cars that was scheduled to be held over four days between 16 and 19 July 2020, but was cancelled due to the COVID-19 pandemic. It was set to mark the sixty-eighth running of Safari Rally and planned to be the seventh round of the 2020 World Rally Championship, World Rally Championship-2 and World Rally Championship-3.

Colin McRae and Nicky Grist were the overall reigning rally winners, but they would not defend their titles as they were no longer active in the sport. Ford World Rally Team, the team they drove for in 2002, when Safari Rally held a World Rally Championship event last time, were the defending manufacturers' winners.

Background

Route

Itinerary
All dates and times were EAT (UTC+3).

Preparation and cancellation

The return of the Safari Rally was long pushed by the FIA president Jean Todt. A candidate event was successfully run in 2019, with WRC safety delegate Michèle Mouton visited the rally. On 27 September 2019, the rally was officially announced to be a part of the championship for the first time since .

References

External links
   
 2020 Safari Rally at ewrc-results.com
 The official website of the World Rally Championship

2020 in Kenyan sport
Safari
2020
Safari